Araranca (possibly from Quechua for a little lizard) is a mountain in the Cordillera Blanca in the Andes of Peru, about  high. It is situated in the Ancash Region, Huaraz Province, Olleros District. Araranca lies southwest of Tuctu and northwest of Yanaraju. It lies north of the Araranca valley.

Sources 

Mountains of Peru
Mountains of Ancash Region